Melanie Klaffner (born 22 May 1990) is an Austrian tennis player.

Klaffner has won 15 singles and 23 doubles titles on the ITF Circuit. On 27 January 2014, she reached her best singles ranking of No. 175 in the world. On 25 May 2009, she peaked at No. 148 in the WTA doubles rankings.

Playing for Austria Fed Cup team, Klaffner has a win–loss record of 19–17 as of December 2022.

ITF Circuit finals

Singles: 26 (15 titles, 11 runner–ups)

Doubles: 44 (26 titles, 18 runner–ups)

References

External links

 
 
 
  

1990 births
Living people
People from Waidhofen an der Ybbs
People from Steyr-Land District
Austrian female tennis players
Sportspeople from Lower Austria
Sportspeople from Upper Austria